Schierenbeck is a German surname.

People with the surname 

 Björn Schierenbeck (born 1974), German former professional footballer
 Peggy Schierenbeck (born 1970), German politician

See also 

 Schierenbeke
 Schmerenbeck Educational Centre for Gifted and Talented Children

Surnames
German-language surnames
Surnames of German origin